Kelly J. Doran (born November 22, 1957) is a Minnesota businessman.  He ran for Governor as a member of the Minnesota Democratic-Farmer-Labor Party, but ended his bid in March 2006, stating that the campaign was too difficult for his family.

Biography
Doran was born in Duluth, Minnesota and is the youngest of four children. He is a graduate of the University of Minnesota, and received an MBA from what is now the Carlson School of Management at the University of Minnesota in 1982. Doran was a commercial lender for Bank of America for nine years. Prior to announcing his candidacy for the 2006 election, Doran was president of the Edina based Robert Muir Company, a construction and development company. The company has developed over 3,000,000 square feet (300,000 m²) of retail space around the Twin Cities.

Doran made an unsuccessful bid for Governor of Minnesota in  the 2006 election, running as a pro-business centrist. Initially he had announced that he would run for the United States Senate, but he later set his sights on the Governor's office. His history of donating to Republicans became an issue during the race, and despite donating $1.85 million to his own campaign, Doran dropped out in March 2006.

Since the election, Doran founded Doran Companies, consisting of three arms:  Doran Development, Doran Construction, and Doran Management. In addition to suburban commercial centers, his company has developed high-end student housing, featuring rental rates 10 percent higher than anybody else in the market. Doran developed several properties in the University of Minnesota campus area, including the renovation of Sydney Hall and the Minnesota Dinkydome complex, as well as the 412 Lofts, The Edge on Oak, The Knoll and most recently, The Bridges. The company came under local fire in 2012 for subcontracting non-union labor for its projects. Pickets at Doran's offices and outside of Minneapolis City Hall in protest of the firm's labor practices began in November 2012 have continued throughout the winter.

References

External links
Doran Companies Website
MPR: Campaign 2006 Kelly Doran

Minnesota Democrats
Living people
1957 births
Politicians from Duluth, Minnesota
Carlson School of Management alumni